Aliyu Adu Umar Kama (born 15 June 1949) was the military governor of Plateau State, Nigeria from July 1988 to August 1990 during the military regime of General Ibrahim Babangida.

Kama was born in Hong local government, Adamawa State of Kilba origins. He attended Government Secondary School, Yola (1963–1968), the Nigerian Defense Academy, Kaduna (1969–1972) and the Army school of supply and transport, Ibadan (1972).

Kama was an aspirant to be the People's Democratic Party (PDP) candidate for governor of Adamawa State in the 2007 elections.
In 2009, he was one of the promoters of a new Amana State to be carved out of Adamawa.
In June 2009 he was chairman of the board of Federal Superphosphate Fertilizer Company, Kaduna.

References

Nigerian generals
Living people
Nigerian Muslims
1949 births
Governors of Plateau State